This list of Oceanian animals extinct in the Holocene features animals known to have become extinct in the last 12,000 years on the Oceanian continent, with the exclusion of Australia-New Guinea, New Zealand, and Hawaii, which are listed in separate articles.

Many extinction dates are unknown due to a lack of relevant information.

Mammals

Birds

Undated

Prehistoric

Recent

Local

Reptiles

Amphibians

Insects

Molluscs

Undated

Recent

Local

See also
 Lists of extinct species
 List of Australia-New Guinea species extinct in the Holocene
 List of Hawaiian animals extinct in the Holocene
 List of New Zealand species extinct in the Holocene
 List of extinct bird species since 1500
 Extinct in the wild
 Lazarus taxon
 United States Fish and Wildlife Service
 IUCN Red List

Notes

References

 
Oceania
.
†Oceania